Herbie Goes to Monte Carlo is a 1977 American sports adventure comedy film directed by Vincent McEveety and written by Arthur Alsberg and Don Nelson. The film is the third installment in the Herbie film series and the sequel to Herbie Rides Again (1974). In the film, Dean Jones returns as champion race car driver Jim Douglas (reprising his role from The Love Bug, the first film in the series), joined this time by his somewhat cynical and eccentric riding mechanic Wheely Applegate (Don Knotts). The film follows Douglas, Applegate, and Herbie as they participate in the fictional Trans-France Race, a road race from Paris, France, to Monte Carlo, Monaco.

Herbie Goes to Monte Carlo was followed by Herbie Goes Bananas (1980).

Plot

Jim Douglas, his partner and mechanic Wheely Applegate, and Herbie arrive in Paris to qualify for and compete in the Trans-France Race (a fictional version of the Monte Carlo Rally), in the hopes of staging a career comeback. The team has three major opponents in the race: Bruno Von Stickle (Eric Braeden), a German driver with experience in the "European Racing Circuit," Claude Gilbert (Mike Kulcsar), a French driver, and Diane Darcy (Julie Sommars), a beautiful young woman and the only female driver in the Trans-France Race. 

Herbie falls in love at first sight with Giselle, Daine's Lancia Scorpion. Diane initially hates Jim for what was apparently his, but actually was Herbie's knee-jerk behaviour that ruin her chances of succeeding during the first qualifying rounds, as the strong-willed Diane does not appear to believe in any cars that can be alive and have a mind of their own. Herbie and Giselle go on a 'date' together, and the following day both cars qualify successfully for the race, Herbie performing donuts across the line in a bid to impress Giselle.

Meanwhile, two diamond thieves, Max (Bernard Fox) and Quincey (Roy Kinnear), steal the famous Étoile de Joie (French for "Star of Joy") diamond and hide it in Herbie's fuel tank in order to avoid being captured by a swarm of searching policemen. They attempt to steal Herbie to retrieve the diamond, but Herbie causes them to blow every chance they get. The pair even threaten Jim and Wheely at gunpoint, an encounter from which Herbie manages to escape by driving through a gypsy camp and a building site. Wheely assumes Diane hired the two goons to knock them out of the race, causing a misunderstanding between Jim and Diane. Herbie is also taken into protection by the French police, headed by Inspector Bouchet (Jacques Marin) and his eager junior officer Fontenoy (Xavier Saint-Macary), causing them to miss the start of the race the following day. Giselle also refuses to start the race without Herbie, much to Diane's exasperation, but does so after Wheely lies to Giselle that Herbie has broken up with her. When Fontenoy eventually arrives with Herbie, Wheely also lies to Herbie that Giselle did the same to persuade Herbie to start the race, albeit from last place.

After numerous setbacks and delays, including another run in with the jewel thieves, Herbie, Jim and Wheely race back into contention. After Diane and Giselle crash into a lake, Herbie turns around and charges back to save them, after Jim reveals Wheely had lied to him. After being rescued by Herbie and Jim, Diane's attitude toward Jim softens, and Diane begins to understand that cars can have minds of their own. Herbie refuses to restart because of being determined to stay with Giselle, but Diane encourages Herbie not to relent in the quest for victory in the Trans-France Race, but not before Herbie makes Wheely get down on his knees and apologise for lying to him. With Diane now out of the race, Jim pursues Von Stickle through the streets of Monte Carlo, leading to a thrilling duel for the win. Herbie takes the lead by driving upside down on the tunnel roof of the Monaco Grand Prix Circuit, and Jim drives Herbie to victory.
 
After the race, it is revealed that Inspector Bouchet, also known as "Double X" as a code name to the thieves, is the real mastermind behind the museum robbery, though the motive of his scheme is revealed as he also threatens Jim and Wheely at gunpoint, only to be foiled by Herbie rolling onto his foot and knocking the gun out of his hands with his hood. Fontenoy, having himself unravelled the mystery of L'Étoile de Joie, has Bouchet clapped in handcuffs and arrested.

In the end, Jim and Diane begin to fall in love, as do Wheely and the Monte Carlo trophy girl. Most of all, Herbie and Giselle fall in love again as well, and celebrate Herbie's victory by watching a brilliant firework display over the Monte Carlo harbour.

Cast
 Dean Jones as James "Jim" Douglas
 Don Knotts as Cory "Wheely" Applegate
 Julie Sommars as Diane Darcy
 Jacques Marin as Inspector Bouchet
 Roy Kinnear as Quincey
 Bernard Fox as Max
 Eric Braeden as Bruno Von Stickle
 Xavier Saint-Macary as Detective Fontenoy
 François Lalande as Monsieur Ribeaux, The Owner of The Museum "Étoile de Joie" Diamond
 Alan Caillou as Emile, The Chief Monaco Official
 Laurie Main as Duval, The Museum Guard
 Mike Kulcsar as Claude Gilbert
 Johnny Haymer as Race Official
 Stanley Brock as Taxi Driver
 Gérard Jugnot as The Waiter
 Jean-Marie Proslier as Doorman
 Tom McCorry as Showroom M.C.
 Lloyd Nelson as The Mechanic
 Jean-Jacques Moreau as Truck Driver
 Yveline Brière as Girl Friend
 Sébastien Floche as French Tourist
 Madeleine Damien as Old Woman
 Alain Janey as Man At Café
 Raoul Defosse as Police Captain
 Ed Marcus as Exhibit M.C.
 Richard Warlock, Gerald Brutsche, Kevin Johnston, Bob Harris, Carey Loftin, Jesse Wayne, Bill Erickson as The Drivers
 Katia Tchenko as Monte Carlo Trophy Girl (uncredited)
 Josiane Balasko as Woman In The Crowd (uncredited)
 André Penvern as French Policeman (uncredited)

Promotion

Mann's Chinese Theatre
On July 11, 1977, Herbie joined other immortals of the silver screen when he placed his wheel-prints in cement in the forecourt of Mann's Chinese Theatre in Hollywood, California; the ceremony was also attended by the film's stars Dean Jones, Don Knotts and Julie Sommars, as well as several hundred guests and tourists. Mayor of Los Angeles Tom Bradley sent a proclamation officially declaring July 11 as "Herbie Goes to Monte Carlo Day" and a floral wreath was presented to Herbie by Miss Monte Carlo. The ceremony was preceded by a parade on Hollywood Boulevard featuring a traditional Chinese band, firecrackers, 25 Lancia sports cars, clowns, cheerleaders and the Goodyear Blimp. Afterwards, a special invitational screening of Herbie Goes to Monte Carlo was held inside the Chinese Theatre, which was celebrating its 50th anniversary that year.

Novelization
Two different paperback novelizations of the film were published to coincide with the film's release: the US version was written by Vic Crume and published by Scholastic Paperbacks in June 1977; the UK version was written by John Harvey and published by New English Library for the film's UK release in 1978.

Comic book
A comic book of Herbie Goes to Monte Carlo (illustrated by Dan Spiegle) was featured in Walt Disney Showcase #41 published by Gold Key Comics.

Reception
The film holds a 60% rating on Rotten Tomatoes based on 10 reviews, with an average rating of 5.11/10. On Metacritic the film has a weighted average score of 38 out of 100, based on 4 critics, indicating "generally unfavorable reviews".

Home media
Herbie Goes to Monte Carlo was first released on VHS in 1984, early 1985 and re-released November 6, 1985 and September 16, 1997. It was first released on DVD in Region 1 on May 4, 2004 and was re-released as a 2-DVD double feature set along with Herbie Rides Again on April 26, 2009.

On September 2, 2012, Herbie Goes to Monte Carlo was re-released on DVD as part of Herbie: 4-Movie Collection with The Love Bug, Herbie Rides Again and Herbie Goes Bananas.

On June 30, 2015, Herbie Goes to Monte Carlo was released on Blu-ray as a Disney Movie Club exclusive title.

References

External links
 
 
 
 

1977 films
1970s adventure comedy films
American adventure comedy films
1977 romantic comedy films
American romantic comedy films
American sequel films
3
Films set in France
Films set in Paris
Films set in Monaco
Films shot in France
Films shot in Paris
Films shot in Monaco
Films shot in California
Walt Disney Pictures films
Films directed by Vincent McEveety
Films produced by Ron W. Miller
Films adapted into comics
Films scored by Frank De Vol
1970s English-language films
1970s American films